Shortcut Software is an American software company that develops project management software for software development teams. Until September of 2021 it was known as Clubhouse Software.

History
Shortcut Software, then known as Clubhouse Software, was founded in 2014, with the aim of “bringing more transparency and predictive models to the process of software engineering”. After a year in beta, its flagship product, a project management platform called Clubhouse, was launched in 2016.

In December 2017, Clubhouse raised  in Series A round of funding, led by Battery Ventures.

In January 2020, Clubhouse raised  in Series B round of funding, led by Greylock Partners.

The company has no relationship with the invitation-only audio-chat app of the same name which launched on iOS in April 2020. The identical names of the two apps regularly caused confusion after the chat app's launch. For example, in February 2021, after Elon Musk announced that he would make an appearance on the platform, Android users looking for the chat service review bombed Clubhouse Software's Android app, causing the company to pull the app temporarily.

On July 29, 2021, the company announced it would be changing its company and product name to Shortcut, effective mid-September, citing challenges in maintaining its prior brand following the growth of the Clubhouse chat app. It officially switched over to the new name on September 13th, 2021.

Product

Shortcut 
Shortcut is a commercial software product for project management and issue tracking. It includes features to track and plan user stories, plan software development sprints, visualize work in progress with kanban boards, and report on progress of work. Shortcut is also free for up to 10 users.

Shortcut has integrations with Slack, GitHub, GitLab, Bitbucket and others. It is available through a web application and apps for iOS and Android.

Shortcut is written in Clojure, with a custom JavaScript front end. Its features can also be accessed using a REST API.  The Shortcut API (then called the Clubhouse API) was noted in 2019 as "one of the most talked about APIs" by ProgrammableWeb.

References

External links
 

Project management software
Software companies of the United States
Companies based in New York (state)
Companies established in 2014